Professor Andrew Blakers  is Director of the Australian National University Centre for Sustainable Energy Systems, which employs 60 staff. He is responsible for several innovations in solar energy photovoltaic technology, including "Sliver cells". Blakers has secured many research grants and won several awards.

Sliver cell
Sliver Cell photovoltaic technology uses just one tenth of the costly silicon used in conventional solar panels while matching power, performance, and efficiency. Blakers invented the technology with colleague Dr Klaus Weber and developed it with funding from energy supplier Origin Energy and the Australian Research Council.

Honours
Blakers and Klaus Weber won the Australian Institute of Physics' Walsh Medal for their solar research work.

He was 2012 state finalist for the Australian of the year award, in the Australian Capital Territory. He was elected a Fellow of the Royal Society of New South Wales in 2020.

See also

Martin Green
Solar Cell
Solar energy
Solar power in Australia
Photovoltaic and renewable energy engineering in Australia
 Renewable energy commercialization
 International Renewable Energy Agency

References

External links
Centre for sustainable energy systems

Living people
People associated with solar power
Academic staff of the Australian National University
Fellows of the Australian Academy of Technological Sciences and Engineering
Year of birth missing (living people)
Fellows of the Royal Society of New South Wales